Keith Matthews (born 10 June 1982) is an Irish rugby union player for Connacht in the United Rugby Championship. He has played for the Ireland Wolfhounds, Ireland under 21s, Ireland Schoolboys and went on Ireland's 2009 tour to North America. Matthews previously played with Munster and UL Bohemians. Matthews previously attended Ardscoil Ris and the University of Limerick.

He plays as a centre.

Matthews was forced into retirement through injury on 29 November 2011.

References

External links
 Connacht profile

1982 births
Living people
Connacht Rugby players
People educated at Ardscoil Rís, Limerick